Monochamus vagus is a species of beetle in the family Cerambycidae. It was described by Charles Joseph Gahan in 1888, originally under the genus Monohammus. It is known from the Democratic Republic of the Congo. It contains the varietas Monochamus vagus var. bomasi.

References

vagus
Beetles described in 1888
Endemic fauna of the Democratic Republic of the Congo